Heil Honey I'm Home! is a British sitcom, written by Geoff Atkinson and produced in 1990, which was cancelled after one episode. It centres on Adolf Hitler and Eva Braun, who live next door to a Jewish couple, Arny and Rosa Goldenstein. The show spoofs elements of mid-20th century American sitcoms and is driven by Hitler's inability to get along with his neighbours. It caused controversy when broadcast and has been called "perhaps the world's most tasteless situation comedy".

Premise
The first episode opens with a caption card explaining Heil Honeys fictional back-story, which supposes the rediscovered "lost tapes" of an abandoned, never-aired American sitcom created by "Brandon Thalburg Jnr".

In 1938, Adolf Hitler and Eva Braun live in Berlin, next door to a Jewish couple, Arny and Rosa Goldenstein. Hitler and Braun have little in common with their historical counterparts, acting more like a stock sitcom husband and wife. Hitler, for example, appears in a golfing sweater and cravat as well as military garb. The Goldensteins are similarly hackneyed characters, with Arny making frequent disparaging comments about his mother-in-law and mockingly performing a Roman salute at one point. The show is a spoof — not of the Third Reich, but of the sort of sitcoms produced in the United States between the 1950s and 1970s "that would embrace any idea, no matter how stupid". In this spirit the title, plot and dialogue are deliberately vapid and corny and characters are applauded whenever they arrive on set. Patterned after I Love Lucy, the actors have New York accents.

Plot of the first episode
The plot of the first episode centres on the British Prime Minister, Neville Chamberlain, coming to the Hitler house. Not wanting the Goldensteins to interrupt the visit, Hitler instructs Braun to keep the news from Rosa, which she fails to do. Rosa duly invites herself over with hopes of matching Chamberlain with her dull niece Ruth. Hitler gets the Goldensteins drunk in an attempt to make them leave before Chamberlain arrives, but they stay. Arny and Eva end up leading the visiting Prime Minister in a conga line around the living room while Hitler hides the "peace for our time" agreement in the icebox.

Only the pilot was ever screened, although eleven episodes were planned and eight were recorded in which a story arc involved Hitler's secretive attempts to kill the Goldensteins.

Unlike the pilot episode, the other episodes had animated opening titles, similar in nature to those of Bewitched.

Cast
 Neil McCaul as Adolf Hitler
 DeNica Fairman as Eva Braun (replaced by Maria Friedman in unaired episodes)
 Gareth Marks as Arny Goldenstein
 Lewis Barratt as Joseph Stalin (character only appeared in unaired episodes) 
 Caspar Constantine as Background Narrator (exclusive to episode 4) and Kapitänleutnant Günther Stark in the series finale
 Caroline Gruber as Rosa Goldenstein
 Laura Brattan as Ruth
 Thomas Lord as Hermann Göring (only in unaired 1990 Christmas special)
 Ben Boardman as Reinhard Heydrich (character removed from show after episode 6)
 Patrick Cargill as Neville Chamberlain

Production, controversy and cancellation

The programme was written by Geoff Atkinson and commissioned by the satellite television channel Galaxy, part of British Satellite Broadcasting (which later became part of BSkyB). It was shown at 9.30pm on a Sunday, after an episode of Dad's Army. During the credits of Dad's Army, Galaxy's announcer said "And unless Arthur Lowe defeats him, it's the man himself in a few moments in Heil Honey, I'm Home!, as the Galaxy Comedy Weekend continues."

The programme proved controversial, with Hayim Pinner, secretary general of the Board of Deputies of British Jews describing the pilot as "in very bad taste", adding that: "We are against any trivialisation of the Second World War, Hitler or the Holocaust, and this certainly trivialises those things. It's very distasteful and even offensive."

Television historian Marian Calabro described it as "perhaps the world's most tasteless situation comedy". However, some commentators also point out the crassness was intentional, and an element of the parody – among these is David Hawkes, professor of English, who cites Heil Honey, I'm Home! as a "heavy-handed concept", and argues that the show was a failure as a comedy because it "disastrously exceeded" the limits of irony. Even so, the show has reached a level of infamy in which it still gets discussed in incredulous terms on retrospective programmes. 

A video from GarethMarks.com, entitled "Comedy Showreel", contains clips from the pilot and unseen episodes. Arthur Mathews has said that the production company sent him a copy of the entire series. The filming of the series was cancelled immediately by Sky (BSkyB) on its acquisition of British Satellite Broadcasting. The show is one of the most controversial programmes ever to have been screened in the UK; it was listed at number 61 on Channel 4's 100 Greatest TV Moments from Hell.

Atkinson maintains that the aim of the show was not to shock but to examine the appeasement surrounding Hitler in 1938. He said that the satire of this appeasement did not translate as well as he intended. Discussing the furore around the show, Atkinson has also stated that three quarters of the cast were Jewish and did not consider the concept controversial.

See also
List of television series canceled after one episode
Adolf Hitler in popular culture
List of sitcoms known for negative reception
1990 in British television
List of television shows considered the worst
That's My Bush! — Another show parodying American sitcoms using politics

References

External links

 View animated opening titles

1990s British sitcoms
1990 British television series debuts
1990 British television series endings
Fiction set in 1938
1990s British black comedy television series
Sky sitcoms
Cultural depictions of Adolf Hitler
Cultural depictions of Eva Braun
Cultural depictions of Hermann Göring
Cultural depictions of Joseph Stalin
Cultural depictions of Neville Chamberlain
English-language television shows
Nazism in fiction
Political controversies in television
Race-related controversies in television
Sky UK original programming
Television controversies in the United Kingdom
Television series produced at Pinewood Studios
Television series canceled after one episode
Television series set in the 1930s
Television shows set in Berlin
1990 controversies